The 3Doodler is a 3D pen developed by Peter Dilworth, Maxwell Bogue, and Daniel Cowen of WobbleWorks, Inc. (formerly WobbleWorks LLC). The 3Doodler works by extruding heated plastic that cools almost instantly into a solid, stable structure, allowing for the free-hand creation of three-dimensional objects. It utilizes plastic thread made of either acrylonitrile butadiene styrene ("ABS"), polylactic acid ("PLA"), or “FLEXY”, thermal polyurethane (“TPU”) that is melted and then cooled through a patented process while moving through the pen, which can then be used to make 3D objects by hand. The 3Doodler has been described as a glue gun for 3D printing because of how the plastic is extruded from the tip, with one foot of the plastic thread equaling "about 11 feet of extruded material".

There are three models of the pen, Start, Create and Pro, intended for children, general consumers, and professionals respectively.

Origins
The inventors of the 3Doodler, Maxwell Bogue and Peter Dilworth, built the first 3Doodler prototype in early 2012 at the Artisan's Asylum in Somerville, Massachusetts. After waiting fourteen hours for a 3D print job to complete, they discovered that the printer had missed a line. So they decided, "Why not keep it the  way it is and make it a pen?"

Kickstarter campaign
WobbleWorks launched a Kickstarter campaign for the 3Doodler on February 19, 2013, with an initial fundraising target of $30,000. The campaign closed on 25 March 2013. The $50 reward level was the minimum needed to receive the product, with highly recommended reward levels of $75 and $99 including more bags of plastic thread, and the highest level of $10,000 including a "membership in the company’s beta testing program for future products" and the opportunity to spend an entire day with the company's founders, along with the backer's 3Doodler being personally engraved. The reward levels were expanded due to demand, with the added tiers of the product shipping in 2014 rather than in 2013 for the earlier backers. The company also teamed up with several Etsy wire-artists to showcase the abilities of the 3Doodler and to create "limited edition art pieces" for the campaign.

The fundraising target was reached within a matter of hours and many of the reward levels were sold out within the first day, along with all the Etsy art pieces. By February 22, more than $1 million had been pledged, and the final pledge amount exceeded $2 million.

3Doodler Start 
3Doodler Start is a version of the 3Doodler especially designed for little children. The developer states that it is kid-safe, because the tip of the pen does not heat up. Instead of plugging it to a power outlet like other 3Doodlers, one can charge it and press the on button to use the pen.

3Doodler 2.0
In January 2015, an improved version of the 3Doodler was introduced, and a second fundraising campaign on Kickstarter yielded more than $1.5 million. Updates include an option for changing the size and shape of the tip, a smaller design, and a quieter fan.

3Doodler EDU
3Doodler EDU sets are designed to be used in schools by educators and students. The target age group for 3Doodler EDU is from K-12 to University and the pens can be used to add an element of creativity and arts into STEM/STEAM education. 3Doodler EDU has been certified for pedagogical quality by Education Alliance Finland.

Community
The original Kickstarter community has spawned a broader community of people who share their creations online.

Notable creations
   Seashell Dress by SHIGO 
   RC Plane by Matthew Butchard
   Fine Art Pieces by Rachel Goldsmith 
   Ascot Hat by Grace Du Prez
 Plastic Man by Justin Mattarocchia
 Moodle by Nikki Firmin
 The MoMA Design Store Windows
 3D Art Portfolio by Kseniia Snikhovska
 Articulated Anatomical Hand by Ricardo Martínez Herrera

References

External links

 
 

3D printing
Kickstarter-funded products
Art and craft toys